Walter O. Spitzer (1937–2006) was a Canadian epidemiologist and professor of epidemiology and health at McGill University, a position he held from 1975 until his retirement in 1995.

Early life and education
Spitzer was born in Asuncion, Paraguay on February 19, 1937. He was the eldest son of Paul Rosenberg and Elsa Spitzer, both of whom were Baptist missionaries. He received his Doctor of Medicine degree from the University of Toronto in 1962 and his Master of Public Health degree from Yale University in 1970.

Career
From 1969 to 1975, Spitzer was a faculty member at McMaster University. He was appointed a faculty member at McGill in 1975, and was credited with bringing its Department of Epidemiology and Biostatistics to "new, more collegial premises". He chaired this department from 1984 to 1993. He was the founding co-editor of the Journal of Chronic Diseases in 1982, which he and co-editor Alvan Feinstein renamed the Journal of Clinical Epidemiology in 1988. They served as the journal's co-editors until 1994. Spitzer was also the chair of the Quebec Task Force on Spinal Disorders, convened in 1983. He was elected to the Institute of Medicine in 1985.

Research
Spitzer was noted for his research into the potential adverse effects  of oral contraceptives. He has also been credited as a major figure in the development of the modern system of evidence-based medicine, along with Archie Cochrane and David Sackett.

Ableist remarks and attitudes 
Spitzer's remarks revealed research rooted in ableism and disability discrimination, including a reference to people on the autism spectrum as having "a terminal illness... a dead soul in a live body." These remarks were looked back on by both autism experts and by individuals on the autism spectrum with renewed scrutiny as a result of the neurodiversity and autism acceptance movements.

Death
Spitzer died on April 27, 2006, following complications of a car accident.

References

Canadian epidemiologists
1937 births
2006 deaths
People from Asunción
Paraguayan emigrants to Canada
Academic staff of McGill University
University of Toronto alumni
Yale University alumni
Medical journal editors
Academic staff of McMaster University
Members of the National Academy of Medicine